Forever Massari is the second studio album by Lebanese/Canadian R&B artist Massari released on November 10, 2009, under the label Universal Music Canada.

The album features co-writing and production by:
Rupert Gayle 
Alex Greggs 
Derek Brin
Rob Wells 
Justin Forsley

Track listing
CD

iTunes Bonus track

References

2009 albums
Massari albums
Universal Music Canada albums